The canton of Cambrai is an administrative division of the Nord department, northern France. It was created at the French canton reorganisation which came into effect in March 2015. Its seat is in Cambrai.

It consists of the following communes:

Abancourt
Anneux
Aubencheul-au-Bac
Bantigny
Blécourt
Boursies
Cambrai
Cuvillers
Doignies
Escaudœuvres
Eswars
Estrun
Fontaine-Notre-Dame
Fressies
Haynecourt
Hem-Lenglet
Mœuvres
Neuville-Saint-Rémy
Paillencourt
Proville
Raillencourt-Sainte-Olle
Ramillies
Sailly-lez-Cambrai
Sancourt
Thun-l'Évêque
Thun-Saint-Martin
Tilloy-lez-Cambrai

References

Cantons of Nord (French department)